Kobamelo Kebaikanye (born 27 August 1991) is a Motswana footballer playing for Orapa United in the Botswana Premier League and the Botswana national football team.

Career
Kebaikanye began his career at Molepolole New Town Highlanders in the KRFA Division One. Although he stayed just one season with the Division One side, he impressed Township Rollers and made the switch to the Premier League in 2010. There he quickly established himself as one of the most fearsome wingers in the league, mainly due to his terrifying pace and dribbling down the flank. He was loaned to fellow Premier League team BDF XI for the 2016–17 season and sold to Orapa United upon his return.

Honours

Club
 Township Rollers
Botswana Premier League:3
2010–11, 2013–14, 2015–16
Mascom Top 8 Cup:1
2011–12
 Orapa United
FA Cup:1
2018–19

References

1991 births
Township Rollers F.C. players
Botswana Defence Force XI F.C. players
Orapa United F.C. players
Living people
Botswana footballers
Botswana international footballers
Association football midfielders